René Grelin (born 21 September 1942) is a French racing cyclist. His sporting career began with V.C. Dole. He rode in the 1970 Tour de France.

References

External links
 

1942 births
Living people
French male cyclists
Place of birth missing (living people)